Czesław Justyn Cywiński (10 March 1926 – 10 April 2010) was the President of the Association of Armia Krajowa Soldiers.  He was among those killed in the 2010 Polish Air Force Tu-154 crash.

Honours and awards
 Polonia Restituta 1st Class (posthum.)
 Polonia Restituta 2nd Class
 Polonia Restituta 3rd Class
 Polonia Restituta 5th Class
 Cross of Valour
 Silver Cross of Merit  Partisan Cross
 Gold Medal for Merit for Country Defense

References 
 

1926 births
2010 deaths
Home Army members
Victims of the Smolensk air disaster
Military personnel from Vilnius
Polish soldiers
Grand Crosses of the Order of Polonia Restituta
Recipients of the Cross of Valour (Poland)
Recipients of the Silver Cross of Merit (Poland)